Don Harvey Francks (February 28, 1932 – April 3, 2016), also known by his stage name Iron Buffalo, was a Canadian actor, musician and singer.

Early life
Don Harvey Francks was born on February 28, 1932, and was adopted shortly after his birth. His mother worked at a music store and his father was an electrician. As a child, he performed on Vancouver radio doing imitations of singers. After dropping out of high school at age 15, he worked in several jobs.

Career

Acting
Francks' acting career began with CBC Television as a regular on Burns Chuckwagon from the Stampede Corral (1955–55) and Riding High (1955), then in the drama The Fast Ones (1959). In 1957 he had a part in the US series The Adventures of Tugboat Annie (actually filmed in Toronto, Ontario), then back to Canada in 1958 for Cannonball and Long Shot (1959). In 1959–60 he starred in the CBC-TV series R.C.M.P., playing Constable Bill Mitchell. In 1968 he co-starred with Fred Astaire and Petula Clark in the film version of Finian's Rainbow.

On February 16, 1964, he appeared on Broadway in the title role of the musical Kelly, as a daredevil planning to jump off the Brooklyn Bridge. The show was the first on Broadway in a generation to close on opening night. During the 1960s, he had roles on the US television programs Mission: Impossible, Jericho, The Man from U.N.C.L.E., The Wild Wild West, and Mannix. His most famous film part was in Francis Ford Coppola's adaptation of Finian's Rainbow. He acted on Broadway in On a Clear Day You Can See Forever and Kelly. 

This Land (1970–86) was a CBC-TV documentary series on Canadian nature, wildlife, natural resources, and life in remote communities. Francks was the narrator. He portrayed writer Grey Owl, returning fifty years after his death to be disturbed by the ecological deterioration (Episode "Land of Shadows", first aired 2 August 1983).

From 1997 to 2001, he played "Walter" in La Femme Nikita (TV series). Early television credits include: Mission: Impossible, Wild Wild West, and several other episodic television appearances. In the 2015 six-part series Gangland Undercover on the History Channel, he played "Lizard". His film work includes The Big Town, My Bloody Valentine and Johnny Mnemonic.

Music
Francks composed songs and played trombone, drums, and flute. He performed in jazz clubs such as George's Spaghetti House in Toronto and the Village Vanguard in New York City, where he recorded the album Jackie Gleason Says No One in This World Is Like Don Francks (Kapp, 1963). In New York City he recorded Lost...and Alone (Kapp, 1965).

In August 1962 his avant-garde jazz group Three debuted unrehearsed at the Purple Onion coffeehouse in Toronto, Canada. Francks, Lenny Breau on guitar, and Eon Henstridge on double bass were joined on stage by tap dancer Joey Hollingsworth. The evening was recorded live by Breau's manager, George B. Sukornyk, but wasn't released until 2004 under the name At the Purple Onion (Art of Life, 2004). The band performed regularly in Toronto and New York City and appeared in the National Film Board documentary Toronto Jazz, which included rehearsals and performances by Three and two other groups. . Francks and Breau briefly reprised Three in early 1968 in Toronto with bassist Dave Young in place of Eon Henstridge, who had died the year before. In 1999, Francks appeared in the documentary The Genius of Lenny Breau.

In 1963, Franks released No One in This World Is Like Don Francks, his first solo album, recorded at the Village Vanguard in New York City. The title of the album derived from a remark made by Jackie Gleason when the trio performed on the April 23, 1963 The Jackie Gleason Show playing "Bye Bye Blackbird". Two years later, he recorded his second album, Lost... and Alone, with orchestral arrangements by Patrick Williams. He recorded his final album, 21st Century Francks, in 2002 at the Top o' the Senator in Toronto. The album was released in 2014.

Voice actor
Francks played Archie Goodwin with Mavor Moore as Nero Wolfe for a 1982 series on Canadian radio. He provided the voice of "Skunk" in Gene Simmons' animated television show, My Dad the Rock Star.

According to differing sources, either Francks or Gabriel Dell was the uncredited actor providing the voice of Boba Fett, a Mandalorian bounty hunter, in the Star Wars Holiday Special. Francks, credited, voiced the role of Boba Fett in an episode of Star Wars: Droids. He voiced several characters in Inspector Gadget, along with his daughter, Cree Summer, who voiced Penny during the first season of the show. He provided the voice for Mok Swagger in the 1983 Canadian animated film Rock and Rule, and the voice of Sabretooth on X-Men. He also voiced both Thomas "House" Conklin & Sergeant Carl Proctor on the 1988 Police Academy animated series.

Personal life
An avid motorcycle rider, Don Francks also had a collection of twelve antique cars, mostly Model-T Ford racing cars dated 1912 to 1927. He supported Greenpeace and the Tibetan independence movement. After quitting alcohol at the age of 21, Francks smoked marijuana, performing a song called "Smoking Reefers". As a spokesman for Other Voices (Canadian TV series) in the mid-1960s, he investigated a boy's murder at Red Pheasant Cree Nation in Saskatchewan.

Later in life, Francks had a son, Bentley Clay Francks-Slaughter, who died in a house fire late in 2008.

Francks died in Toronto on April 3, 2016, of lung cancer.

Selected filmography

Film

Television

Videogames

Awards
 ACTRA Award for Best Dramatic Performance, Drying Up the Streets and The Phoenix Team, 1980 and 1981

Discography

Bibliography
 Heyn, Christopher. "A Conversation with Don Francks". Inside Section One: Creating and Producing TV's La Femme Nikita. Introduction by Peta Wilson. Los Angeles: Persistence of Vision Press, 2006. p. 100–105; .

References

External links
 
  
 
 
  
 
 Official website archived
Filmography 
 Entry at thecanadianencyclopedia.ca

1932 births
2016 deaths
Canadian jazz drummers
Canadian jazz singers
Canadian male film actors
Canadian male singers
Canadian male television actors
Canadian male video game actors
Canadian male voice actors
Canadian people of English descent
Canadian people of German descent
Deaths from cancer in Ontario
Foundrymen
Male actors from British Columbia
Canadian male drummers
People from Burnaby
Canadian male jazz musicians